An Young-myung (Hangul: 안영명, Hanja: 安永命; born November 19, 1984) is a South Korean right-handed starting pitcher who plays for the Hanwha Eagles of the KBO League.

External links 
Career statistics and player information from Korea Baseball Organization

Hanwha Eagles players
Kia Tigers players
KBO League pitchers
South Korean baseball players
People from Cheonan
1984 births
Living people
Sportspeople from South Chungcheong Province